Phoenix Airport railway station, alternatively Fenghuang Airport railway station or Fenghuangjichang railway station is a railway station on the Hainan western ring high-speed railway. It is located on the western outskirts of Sanya City, some 15 km west of downtown, adjacent to Sanya Phoenix International Airport. The station started operation on 30 December 2015.

History
The 10-km-long section from the Sanya railway station to the Phoenix Airport railway station is the first section 
of the Hainan Western Ring High-Speed Railway. The construction work was completed by the end of 2014.  Since the rest of the Western Ring Railway (i.e., the much longer section from the Phoenix Airport to Haikou) was completed significantly later, the Sanya railway station to Phoenix Airport railway station section was presumably operated for a while as an extension of the Hainan eastern ring high-speed railway (for which the Sanya railway station is presently the terminal).

Notes

Railway stations in Hainan
Sanya
Airport railway stations in China
Railway stations in China opened in 2015